Brasenose College Boat Club (BNCBC) is the rowing club of Brasenose College, Oxford, in Oxford, England. It is one of the oldest boat clubs in the world, having beaten Jesus College Boat Club in the first modern rowing race, held at Oxford in 1815. Although rowing at schools such as Eton and Westminster School Boat Club predates this, the 1815 contest is the first recorded race between rowing clubs anywhere in the world.

In addition to the 1815 "headship", the club has won both the Summer Eights and Torpids headship many times, and has recorded numerous victories in most events at the Henley Royal Regatta.

The club's colours are black and gold, with black blades. The 1st VIII, however, may wear the distinctive "Childe of Hale" colours — red, purple and gold — which are traditional in Brasenose rowing.

History

The beginnings of competitive rowing 

Brasenose has a long history on the water. The first amateur race between organised clubs which prepared and trained for the event occurred in Oxford in 1815.  In this year, crews from Brasenose College and Jesus College raced for the Head of the River, from Iffley Lock to Mr King’s Barge, which was moored near the current Head of the River public house. The event is also notable for the fact that both crews rowed in eight oared boats, specially built for the purpose.  Such recreational rowing as occurred at this time was usually conducted in pairs, or four or six oared cutters.  The fact the racing was conducted in eight oared boats gave rise to the event being known as Eights.

In the early days of Oxford college rowing, these two colleges were the only crews competing, and were joined shortly thereafter by Christ Church and Exeter. Students would row to the inn at Sandford-on-Thames, a few miles south of Oxford, and race each other on the way back. The races would start at Iffley Lock and finish at King's Barge, off Christ Church Meadow. Flags hoisted on the barge would indicate the finishing order of the crews. Crews would set off one behind the other, the trailing boat(s) trying to catch, or "bump", the boat ahead. The bumped boat and the bumping boat would then drop out and the bumping boat would start the next day's race ahead of the bumped boat. The aim was to become the lead boat, known as Head of the River.

In 1822, crews from Jesus and Brasenose raced each other to become Head of the River. One Brasenose rower apparently "caught a crab", slowing the boat. The Brasenose boat was bumped by the Jesus boat, but then began to row again and finished ahead. As there were no definite rules in those days, both the Jesus and Brasenose men competed over which college's flag should be hoisted to denote the Headship. One of the Brasenose crew ended the dispute by saying "Quot homines tot sententiae, different men have different opinions, some like leeks and some like onions", referring to the leek emblem on the Jesus oars, and it was agreed to row the race again. The Brasenose crew won the rematch, and the incident has been said to be shown in an 1822 picture, the earliest depiction of an eights race at Oxford, painted by I. T. Serres (Marine Painter to George IV).

To this day, Brasenose and Jesus Men's 1st VIIIs compete in an annual race on the Isis for the 1815 Challenge Plate.

In 1846 Oxford University Boat Club gave up their barge and this was then used by Brasenose for many years.

For identification, crews wore college colours and emblazoned the rudder of the boat with the college coat of arms.

"Childe of Hale" 

John Middleton, the "Childe of Hale," was a 17th-century giant, standing over nine feet tall, from Hale in Lancashire. He accompanied his landlord, Sir Gilbert Ireland, to the court of James I, where he took on the King's champion wrestler and won. Sir Gilbert, later Lord of the Manor of Hale, was a member of Brasenose College at the time, and he brought Middleton to College on his return from court, where two life–size portraits were painted of him wearing his "London costume" - a fantastic outfit of red, purple and gold. When, in 1815, the students came to establish a Boat Club, it was this story and tradition that was used as inspiration. The Childe of Hale has since been a role model for generations of rowers and a portrait still hangs in the college.

By tradition, the First VIII is now called "The Childe of Hale," and the First VIII wears the colours of the Childe's London costume — red, purple and gold. This follows an older tradition where each new boat would be given a name.

Henley Royal Regatta 
In the first Henley Regatta of 1839, Brasenose competed in the only race, the Grand Challenge, against two other Oxford boats (the Etonian Club and Wadham) and First Trinity, Cambridge. It is recorded that:
The Etonian Club were dressed in white guernseys with pale blue facings, rosette sky blue. Brasenose had blue striped guernseys, blue cap with gold tassel, rosette yellow, purple and crimson. Wadham wore white guernseys with narrow blue stripes, dark blue cap with light blue velvet band, and light blue scarf, and Trinity College were attired in blue striped guernseys, rosette French Blue.
The race was won by First Trinity, Cambridge.  It is suggested the Brasenose crew's prospects of winning the race were impaired by their having rowed their boat down from Oxford - a distance of 47 miles by river - the day before.

Brasenose competed again in 1846, and in 1847 won the Ladies Plate, beating First Trinity, Cambridge.

BNCBC won the Visitors' at Henley in 1851 (the first "Royal" Regatta) rowing as "Childe of Hale Boat Club" in an attempt to hide their identities.  They also won the Ladies Plate that year, beating Christ Church Boat Club.

In total, Brasenose College championships at the Henley Royal Regatta include the Diamond Challenge Sculls five times; the Stewards' Challenge Cup twice (in which Brasenose College Boat Club invented the coxless four; see details below); the Ladies' Challenge Plate three times; the Silver Goblets and Nickalls' Challenge Cup six times; the Visitors Challenge Cup six times; the Wyfold Cup once; in addition to winning the Grand Challenge Cup in composites with Leander Club several times in a row in the 1890s.

More recently, Brasenose College Boat Club gave 1994 Temple Challenge Cup winners Imperial College their closest race of the regatta.

Wins at Henley Royal Regatta

Invention of the coxless four 

In a cause celebre, Walter Bradford Woodgate introduced the coxless four to the United Kingdom in 1868, when he got his Brasenose cox, Frederic Weatherly (later a well-known lawyer and writer of the song "Danny Boy"), to jump overboard at the start of the Steward's Cup at Henley Royal Regatta. While Weatherley narrowly escaped strangulation by the water lilies, Woodgate and his home-made steering device triumphed by 100 yards and were promptly disqualified.

A special Prize for four-oared crews without coxswains was offered at the regatta in 1869 when it was won by the Oxford Radleian Club and when Stewards’ became a coxless race in 1873, Woodgate "won his moral victory," the Rowing Almanack later recalled. “Nothing but defeating a railway in an action at law could have given him so much pleasure.”

Brasenose and "Childe of Hale Boat Club" went on to record legitimate victories in the event.

Two years later, Woodgate founded Vincent's Club as "an elite social club of the picked hundred of the University, selected for all round qualities; social, physical and intellectual".

Women's rowing

The participation of women in the BNCBC was made possible with the admission of women undergraduates in 1974, and a BNCBC Women's crew first contested Eights in 1976.  Since that time, women members of BNCBC have represented Oxford in OUWBC Blue Boat, Osiris and OUWLRC crews, alongside their male colleagues who have competed in OUBC Blue Boat, Isis, OULRC Blue Boat and Nephthys crews.

Recent history

Since 1990, BNCBC Men's 1st VIII crews have finished as high as fourth in Summer Eights, and BNCBC Women's 1st VIII crews have finished as high as second in Summer Eights.

Headships

Brasenose holds the second most consecutive headships in Torpids (a 9-year unbeaten streak) behind Oriel College who went an astonishing 28 years undefeated.

In the Summer Eights Brasenose held headship in the following years: 
 1815, 1816, 1821, 1822, 1827, 1839, 1840, 1845, 1846, 1852–54, 1865–67, 1876, 1888–91, 1928-31.

This makes Brasenose the third most successful college boat club in Oxford, behind Oriel College and Christ Church.  The Childe of Hale (M1) made a strong bid to regain the headship in the 1990s, bumping as high as second on the river in Torpids and fourth on the river in Summer Eights.

Notable people
Brasenose has a rich tradition of representation in The Boat Race and in the other Oxford and Cambridge races. Below are the names of Brasenose students past and present who have won "blues" or colours competing for OUBC and the other university boats.

One of the most celebrated of Brasenose College oarsmen was the larger-than-life Walter Bradford Woodgate, who once wagered he could walk the fifty-seven miles from Stones Chop House in London's Panton Street (near Leicester Square) to Brasenose in time for breakfast. The leading oarsman of his age, he won eleven Henley titles in the 1860s, including three in two days in 1862, when he narrowly missed a fourth victory after dead-heating the final of the Diamonds. Along with Edwin Brickwood, he was one of the earliest chroniclers of rowing in the United Kingdom.

Famous past Brasenose oarsmen include C. W. Kent, reputed to be the greatest stroke in the world in the 1890s, and John Conrad "Con" Cherry, a winning Boat Race stroke, and President of OUBC, who was President of Leander at the time of his death in World War II.

More recently, another well-known BNCBC member was Andrew Lindsay, a member of the Great Britain Olympic Eight that won the gold medal at the 2000 Summer Olympics.

Other notable members of BNCBC include Bill O'Chee, Michelle Dipp, John Cherry, Guy Spier, Dominic Barton, and Walter Bradford Woodgate and Ella Shalom, the current President of the Club. Daniel Maloney, (retired) excellent rower and notorious for his organizational skills, is currently setting up camp: please do sign up if u fancy rowing. 

Among its various coaches, Brasenose College Boat Club enjoyed the services of Rudy Lehmann for five years from 1887 to 1891. In 1894 and 1895, Lehmann was captain of Leander, and was responsible for recruiting a number of prominent Brasenose oarsmen into winning Leander crews in successive Grand Challenge Cup races at Henley Royal Regatta. After resigning as coach of the College's 1st VIII, he donated a silver cup to the college.

Gallery

References 

Bibliography
 
Brasenose College Boat Club - History. Brasenose College Boat Club. Retrieved 12 March 2013.

External links 

 BNCBC official website
 Pathé newsreel of Brasenose Head of the River 1931

Rowing clubs of the University of Oxford
History of rowing
Boat Club
Sports clubs established in the 1810s
1815 establishments in England
Rowing clubs in Oxfordshire
Rowing clubs of the River Thames